The Commercial Aircraft Corporation of China, Ltd. (COMAC) is a Chinese state-owned aerospace manufacturer established on 11 May 2008 in Shanghai. The headquarters are in Pudong, Shanghai. The company has a registered capital of RMB 19 billion ( as of May 2008). The corporation is a designer and constructor of large passenger aircraft with capacities of over 150 passengers.

The first jet to be marketed is the ARJ21 developed by China Aviation Industry Corporation I, which will be followed by the C919, which made its maiden flight in 2017 and has attracted interest from Chinese airlines. The C919, which can seat up to 168 passengers, is meant to compete in the market for single-aisle jets.

History

Origins

COMAC, Commercial Aircraft Corporation of China, was established on 11 May 2008 in Shanghai. It was established jointly by Aviation Industry Corporation of China, Aluminum Corporation of China, Baosteel Group Corporation, Sinochem Group, Shanghai Guosheng Corporation Limited, and State-owned Assets Supervision and Administration Commission.

U.S. sanctions 

In January 2021, the United States government named COMAC as a company "owned or controlled" by the People's Liberation Army and thereby prohibited any American company or individual from investing in it. Later it was removed by the Biden administration.

Products

Model naming convention
For all models sold beginning with the Comac C919, COMAC's naming system for commercial airliners has taken the form of 9X9.

Aircraft in production or development

Orders and deliveries

Collaborations

Bombardier
On 24 March 2011, Comac and the Canadian company Bombardier Inc. signed a framework agreement for a long-term strategic cooperation on commercial aircraft.

Products included in the programme include:
Bombardier CRJ-series
Bombardier CSeries
Bombardier Q-series
Comac ARJ21
Comac C919

In May 2017, Bombardier and Comac began holding talks about an investment into Bombardier's passenger jet business.

Boeing 
On 23 September 2015, Boeing announced plans to build a Boeing 737 completion and finishing plant in China. The facility will be used to paint exteriors and install interiors into airframes built in the United States. The joint-venture plant will be located in Zhoushan, Zhejiang.

Ryanair 
In June 2011 COMAC and Irish low-cost airline Ryanair signed an agreement to cooperate on the development of the C919, a 200-seat narrow-body commercial jet which will compete with the Boeing 737 and Airbus A320.

UAC 

China-Russia Commercial Aircraft International Co. Ltd. (CRAIC), a joint venture company invested by COMAC and Russia's United Aircraft Corporation (UAC) responsible for the development of a wide-body commercial jet, was established in Shanghai on 22 May 2017. Research and development for the new plane will be conducted in Moscow, and it will be assembled in Shanghai.

See also

List of civil aircraft
List of aircraft produced by China
Aero Engine Corporation of China (AECC)

References

External links

 
 

 
Aerospace companies of China
Aircraft manufacturers of China
Vehicle manufacturing companies established in 2008
Multinational aircraft manufacturers
Science and technology in China
Chinese brands
Chinese companies established in 2008